The Cabinet of the Republic of Kenya is made up of the President, Deputy President, Attorney General and Cabinet Secretaries.  The 2010 Constitution of Kenya allows a maximum of 22 ministries under Article 152 and sets the minimum number to 14. A Cabinet Secretary is not a member of the Kenyan Parliament and has to be vetted by a parliamentary committee before their appointment.

Members of the Cabinet

Other Cabinet Nominees

Secretary to the Cabinet - Mercy Wanjau

National Security Advisor - Monica Juma

Women Rights Agency Advisor - Harriet Chigau

See also
 List of Ministers of Kenya
 Ministries of Kenya
 Government of Kenya

References

External links
IN PICTURES: Cabinet nominees, Daily Nation
Structure and Composition of Full Cabinet of Kenya: November 2015

K
Government of Kenya
Politics of Kenya